Wasatch Academy is an independent, coeducational, college preparatory boarding school for grades 7-12 located in Mount Pleasant, Utah, United States.  It was founded in 1875 by Reverend Duncan McMillan, a Presbyterian minister who had come to the Sanpete Valley, in the mountains of central Utah, to both recover his health and to do missionary work among members of the Church of Jesus Christ of Latter-day Saints living in the geographic center of Utah.

Campus
Wasatch Academy consists of the Loftin-Lewis Student Center, Craighead Humanities Building, Reemtsma Mathematics and Science Building, Coltharp Center for Evolving Technologies, Studio Arts Center, Multi-Purpose Building (housing the school's secondary gym, weight lifting room, climbing wall, etc.), Joseph R. Loftin Fieldhouse, Brunger-Wilkey Gymnasium, Bernadette and Edward Feeney Music Conservatory, Tigers Den Performing Arts Center, eight residence halls, an administration building, wellness center, and a student-run coffee shop.

The majority of the faculty, many having a Ph.D. in their respective field, live in school-owned homes that surround the campus.

The school has five dual-diploma campuses in China, as a part of joint educational ventures with Chinese high schools. The program at Ruian High School is the first ever granted by the Chinese Ministry of Education. The other partner programs are with the Beijing National Day School, Zhejiang Chengtan High School, Nanjing Foreign Language School and Kunshan High School. They provide Chinese students with a dual diploma, one from the Chinese high school and one from Wasatch Academy. Overall, Wasatch Academy partners with over 18 schools in China, India, Ecuador, Peru, Japan, and Chile to offer dual diplomas, exchanges, and collaborations.

Graduation requirements
Students must earn a minimum of 24 academic credits, and must be enrolled for their entire senior year, during which time they must earn a minimum of six academic credits in order to graduate.

Eight semesters of English and Math:
The school requires eight semesters of English (I, II, III, and IV).  International students must complete English III to obtain a regular diploma, or English II for an ESL diploma. Students must also complete eight semesters of Math, with a minimum successful completion of Algebra I, Geometry, and Algebra II.

Six semesters of History and Science:
The school requires six semesters of History/Social Sciences, two of which are dedicated to US History.  Freshmen and sophomores must complete a full two-year sequence of Global Studies. Students must also complete six semesters of Science.  Two semesters in Biology are required; Chemistry and/or Physics are strongly recommended.

Four semesters of International Languages and Fine Arts:
The school recommends that all students take six semesters dedicated to the study of a foreign language, with a minimum of four semesters (in the same language) required for graduation. Honors Program students are required to study six semesters of a foreign language. Students must also complete four semesters in Fine Arts.

See also

 National Register of Historic Places listings in Sanpete County, Utah

References

External links

 
 Basketball website
 The Association of Boarding Schools profile

Boarding schools in Utah
Educational institutions established in 1875
Preparatory schools in Utah
Private high schools in Utah
Schools in Sanpete County, Utah
School buildings on the National Register of Historic Places in Utah
Historic districts on the National Register of Historic Places in Utah
National Register of Historic Places in Sanpete County, Utah
1875 establishments in Utah Territory